Public ministry may refer to:

Christianity
Public ministry of Jesus
Public ministers in Christian churches, such as pastors and priests. This term is used especially in State Churches or churches derived from State Churches, where the position is given a similar term as Civil servants and secular officials

Government
 Public office
 Public official who holds the office
 Civil service
Public Ministry (Brazil), the Brazilian body of independent public prosecutors
Public Ministry (Netherlands), the body of public prosecutors in the Netherlands
Public Ministry (Portugal), the Portuguese body of independent public prosecutors
Prosecution Ministry, the Spanish body of independent public prosecutors